The 1993–94 Divizia B was the 54th season of the second tier of the Romanian football league system.

The format has been maintained to two series, each of them having 18 teams. At the end of the season, the winners of the series promoted to Divizia A and the last two places from both series relegated to Divizia C.

Team changes

To Divizia B
Promoted from Divizia C
 Constructorul Iași
 Metalul Plopeni
 Gaz Metan Mediaș
 Phoenix Baia Mare

Relegated from Divizia A
 Selena Bacău
 CSM Reșița

From Divizia B
Relegated to Divizia C
 Olt 90 Scornicești
 Metalurgistul Cugir
 Unirea Slobozia
 Olimpia Satu Mare

Promoted to Divizia A
 Ceahlăul Piatra Neamț
 UTA Arad

Renamed teams
Unirea Focșani was renamed as Acord Focșani.

CSM Suceava was renamed as Bucovina Suceava.

Autobuzul București was renamed as Rocar București.

League tables

Serie I

Serie II

Relegation play-off
Phoenix Baia Mare and Metalul Bocșa ended the season with the same number of points and the Romanian Football Federation decided to organize a relegation play-off match to decide which team stays in the Divizia B and which team relegates to Divizia C.

|}

Top scorers 
11 goals
  Marius Păcurar (Corvinul Hunedoara)

10 goals
  Gabriel Mărgărit (Faur București)
  Constantin Barbu (Argeș Pitești)

9 goals
  Cristian Coroian (CFR Cluj)
  Dănuț Matei (CFR Cluj)

8 goals
  Daniel Baston (Gloria CFR Galați)

6 goals
  Attila Piroska (CFR Cluj)
  Daniel Huza (Jiul Petroșani)
  Dănuț Oprea (Gloria CFR Galați)

5 goals
  Mircea Stanciu (ASA Târgu Mureș)

See also 
 1993–94 Divizia A

References 

Liga II seasons
Rom
2